Alantez Fox (born March 13, 1992) is an American professional boxer.

While beginning his professional career as a middleweight, Fox was closely compared to Paul Williams due in large part to both fighters being extremely tall for their weight class.

Professional career 
Fox turned professional at the age of 18 instead of attempting to represent the United States in the 2012 Summer Olympics due to the rumors that the protective headgear would not be used, even though the headgear was used in 2012 and not removed until the 2016 Summer Olympics.

Fox's most notable fight occurred in October 2017 on HBO's Boxing After Dark when he fought Demetrius Andrade and lost his undefeated record via a unanimous decision.

Fox is promoted by Lou DiBella's DiBella Entertainment.

Professional boxing record

References 

Living people
1992 births
American male boxers
Middleweight boxers
Boxers from Washington, D.C.